WKTS (90.1 FM, The Bridge) is a radio station broadcasting a contemporary Christian music format. Licensed to Kingston, Tennessee, United States, the station is currently owned by Foothills Broadcasting, Inc.

In 2021, WKTS News began reporting local news in Sheboygan, Wisconsin which was the original home of WKTS being before sold.

References

External links
 

KTS
Roane County, Tennessee